Anas Abdel-Salem Al-Jbarat (born February 24, 1989) is a Jordanian football player who currently plays as a central midfielder for Al-Faisaly.

International career
Al-Jbarat played his first match with the Jordan national senior team against Lebanon in an international friendly on 31 August 2016, which resulted in a draw 1-1.

International career statistics

References

External links 
 
 
 jo.gitsport.net

1989 births
Living people
Jordanian footballers
Jordan international footballers
Jordan youth international footballers
Footballers at the 2010 Asian Games
Sportspeople from Amman
Al-Faisaly SC players
Shabab Al-Ordon Club players
Jordanian Pro League players
Association football midfielders
Asian Games competitors for Jordan